Madison Park is a neighborhood in west Baltimore.

Geography 
Madison Park is bounded by North Avenue to the north, Martin Luther King Boulevard to the south, Eutaw Place and Dolphin Street to the east, and McCulloh Street and Madison Avenue to the west. Adjacent neighborhoods are Reservoir Hill (north), Mount Vernon (south), Seton Hill (south), Bolton Hill (east), Mid-Town Belvedere (east), Upton (west), and Druid Heights (west).

See also 
 State Center / Cultural Center station
 Cecil Apartments

References 

Neighborhoods in Baltimore
West Baltimore